CH-15 was a  of the Imperial Japanese Navy during World War II.

History
CH-15 was laid down by Osaka Iron Works at its Sakurajima shipyard on 26 August 1940, launched on 23 December 1940, and completed and commissioned on 31 March 1941. On 1 November 1946, she was designated a special cargo ship in the Allied Repatriation Service but never assumed duty due to the need for repairs. CH-15 was struck from the Navy List on 30 November 1945 and sold for scrap on 23 April 1948.

References

Additional references

1941 ships
No.13-class submarine chasers
Ships built by Osaka Iron Works